The term "great power" has only been used in historiography and political science since the Congress of Vienna in 1815. Lord Castlereagh, the British Foreign Secretary, first used the term in its diplomatic context in 1814 in reference to the Treaty of Chaumont. Use of the term in the historiography of the Middle Ages is therefore idiosyncratic to each author. In historiography of the pre-modern period, it is more typical to talk of empires.

Gerry Simpson distinguishes "Great Powers", an elite group of states that manages the international legal order, from "great powers", empires or states whose military and political might define an era.

The following is a list of empires that have been called great powers during the Middle Ages:

China (throughout)
Persia (Sasanians, 500–600; Samanids, 900–950; Timurids, 1400–1450)
Byzantine Empire (500–1050)
Göktürk Khaganate (550–600)
Tibetan Empire (650–1250)
The Caliphate (650–850)
Carolingian Empire (751–843)
Turks (Onoq, 650; Seljuks, 1050–1100; Ottomans, 1450–1500)
Vikings (800–1050)
Bulgarian Empire (803–963)
Pratihara Empire (850)
Pala Empire (750-1160)
Rashtrakuta Empire (900)   
Khazar Khaganate (850–900)
Kievan Rus' (900–1050)
Buyid Dynasty (950)
Fatimid Caliphate (950–1050)
Liao Dynasty (950–1150)
Holy Roman Empire (950–1200)
Almoravid Dynasty (1040-1147)
Ghaznavid Dynasty (1050)
Almohad Caliphate (1150–1250)
Angevin Empire (1154-1259)
Mamluk Sultanate of Egypt (1250–1450)
Mongol Empire (1250–1450)
Khmer Empire (1250)
Mali Empire (1300, 1450)
Kingdom of France (since 1300)  
Chagatai Khanate (1350)
Grand Duchy of Lithuania (1450)
Spanish Empire (since 1479)
Inca Empire (1500)
Grand Duchy of Moscow (1500)
 Former countries

See also 
 List of ancient great powers
 List of modern great powers

References

Further reading
 Cooper, F. (2008). Empires and Political Imagination in World History. Princeton [u.a.]: Princeton University Press.
 Doyle, M. W. (1986). Empires. Ithaca, N.Y: Cornell University Press.
 English, Edward D. ed. Encyclopedia Of The Medieval World (2 vol. 2004). 
 Farrington, K. (2003). Historical Atlas of Empires. London: Mercury.
 Harrison, T., & J. Paul Getty Museum. (2009). The Great Empires of the Ancient World. Los Angeles, Calif: J. Paul Getty Museum.
 Khan, A. (2004). A Historical Atlas of India. New York: Rosen Pub.
 Jordan, William Chester. (1996) The Middle Ages: An Encyclopedia for Students (4 Volumes)
 Labberton, R. H. (1884). An historical atlas: A chronological series of one hundred and twelve maps at successive periods. New York.
 Litwin, H. (2016), Central European Superpower, BUM Magazine, October 2016.
  Loyn, H. R. (1989) The Middle Ages: A Concise Encyclopedia. (1989) 
 Morris, I., & Scheidel, W. (2009). The Dynamics of Ancient Empires: State power from Assyria to Byzantium. Oxford: Oxford University Press.
 Pella, John & Erik Ringmar, History of International Relations Open Textbook Project, Cambridge: Open Book, forthcoming.
 Petitjean, P., Jami, C., Moulin, A. M., & Equipe REHSEIS (Centre national de la recherche scientifique (France)). (1992). Science and Empires: Historical Studies about Scientific Development and European Expansion. Dordrecht: Kluwer Academic Publishers.
 Shepherd, W. R., & C.S. Hammond & Company. (1911). Historical Atlas. New York: Henry Holt and Co.
 Stearns, Peter N. ed. The Encyclopedia of World History (2001).

History of international relations
Great powers
Great Powers